Akbuzat (from аҡбуҙ "blue-grey" and ат "horse") is the most famous kubair (epic poem) of the Bashkirs. It shows similarity to other epics (notably the story of Pegasus).

Plot 
The main hero of the epic poem Akbuzat is Hauban. He travels to the underwater kingdom Shulgen to search for the сurly horse Akbuzat and the diamond sword Ural-batyr. He destroys the kingdom, frees Akbuzat, and returns to liberate his people from slavery under Khan Masim.

References

Bashkir culture
Bashkir mythology